The Buzhans were one of the tribal unions of Early Slavs, which supposedly formed East Slavs in Southern Russia and Volga region. They are mentioned as Buzhane in the Primary Chronicle. Several localities in Russia are claimed to be connected to the Buzhans, like for example Sredniy Buzhan in the Orenburg Oblast, Buzan and the Buzan river in the Astrakhan Oblast.

Some theories say that the name of the tribes could be connected to Western Bug, in Ukraine, where they chose to settle down. According to the Bavarian Geographer, the Buzhans had 230 "cities" (fortresses). Some historians believe that the Buzhans and the Volhynians used to be called the Dulebes.

There are even theories connecting the name of the river, region and country of Bosnia to the Buzhans. These theories are mostly promoted by the Bavarian Geographer, Joachim Lelewel and Muhamed Hadžijahić.

See also
 List of Medieval Slavic tribes

References

Slavic tribes